Final Gençlik is a Turkish basketball team based in Bursa, Turkey which plays in Turkish Basketball League (TBL). They were founded in 2006 and their home ground is Final Okulları Sport Hall There is also a primary school named Final Okulları.

Roster

Source : Roster (Updated : October 23, 2015)

External links 
 Eurobasket.com Page

Basketball teams in Turkey
Sport in Bursa
Basketball teams established in 2006
2006 establishments in Turkey